Anni Reifinger is a retired West German slalom canoeist who competed in the 1950s. She won three medals at the ICF Canoe Slalom World Championships with two silvers (Folding K-1 team: 1951, 1955) and a bronze (Folding K-1: 1951).

References
ICF medalists for Olympic and World Championships - Part 2: rest of flatwater (now sprint) and remaining canoeing disciplines: 1936-2007.

West German female canoeists
Possibly living people
Year of birth missing
Medalists at the ICF Canoe Slalom World Championships